The Vision, the Sword and the Pyre – Part I is the eighteenth studio album by German rock band Eloy. It was released in 2017 through Artist Station Records, reaching No. 22 on the German charts and No. 46 on the Swiss charts in its first week.

The album is the first part of a rock opera about the life of Jeanne d'Arc, the realization of which had been a wish of frontman Frank Bornemann's since the 1990s.

The second and final part was released on 27 September 2019.

Track listing 
All music and lyrics by Frank Bornemann.

Personnel 
Eloy
 Frank Bornemann – vocals, guitar, keyboards
 Klaus-Peter Matziol – bass
 Michael Gerlach – keyboards
 Hannes Folberth – keyboards
 Kristof Hinz – drums, percussion

Guest musicians
 Julian Göke – bass, vocals (1)
 Isgaard Marke – vocals (9)
 Jessy Martens – vocals (13)
 Anke Renner – backing vocals (3, 5, 6, 11)
 Alexandra Seubert – backing vocals (3, 9, 11)
 Simon Moskon – backing vocals (3, 9)
 Sven-Arne Zinnke – backing vocals (5)
 Lisa Laage-Smidt – backing vocals (6)
 Simon Moskon – backing vocals (8)
 The Children's Choir of the Marktkirche Hannover – chorus vocals (9)
 Lisa Laage-Smidt – choir director (9)
 Jens Lück – keyboards (1, 5)
 Niklas Fischer – keyboards (3, 8)
 Artur Kühfuß – keyboards (5, 8)
 Christoph Van Hal – strings (1, 10)
 Volker Kuinke – recorder and flute (3, 6, 8, 10)
 Johannes Berger – viol (9)
 Kim Hutchinson – spoken voice (2)
 Kai Ritter – spoken voice (2, 4)
 Alice Merton – spoken voice (5, 6, 8)
 Bick Buttchereit – spoken voice (8)
 Eric Pulverich – spoken voice (8)
 Leon Kaack – spoken voice (8)
 Steve Mann – spoken voice (8)

Charts

References

External links

2017 albums
Eloy (band) albums
Rock operas
Works about Joan of Arc